Puppets of Fate may refer to:

 Puppets of Fate (1921 film), 1921 American silent melodrama directed by Dallas M. Fitzgerald for Metro Pictures
 Puppets of Fate (1933 film), 1933 British crime film directed by George A. Cooper